Shai Hills is a suburb near district capital Dodowa in the Dangme West District of the Greater Accra Region of Ghana, north of Accra.

Shai is a plain by topography but has outcrops of hills. The hills in the Shai area is base to several stone quarries. Its vegetation is a combination of open and wooded grassland, and fauna found there include guinea fowls, antelopes, baboons and francolins.

Tourism

Shai Hills Resource Reserve

Location 
Shai Hills Resource Reserve is only 51 square kilometres and is the closest wildlife park to Accra, only 17 kilometers away compared to Mole National Park and Kakum National Park.

Transport 
Shai Hills is served by a railway station on the eastern part of the national railway network, and is indeed a suburban terminus. This has being their major source of transportation for a long time.

See also 
 Railway stations in Ghana
 Stone Quarry

References

External links 
 Train Station

Populated places in the Greater Accra Region